This Is Fort Apache is a 1995 compilation album of songs recorded at Fort Apache Studios, a recording studio which has been located at several locations around the New England area. The alternative rock album was the first release of Fort Apache/MCA Records, a partnership between the studio and MCA Records. The album's packaging work, by designer Tim Stedman, received a nomination for the Grammy Award for Best Recording Package at the 38th Annual Grammy Awards ceremony, losing to Robbie Cavolina and Joni Mitchell for Turbulent Indigo. The album includes songs by the label's first signees Cold Water Flat and studio silent partner Billy Bragg.

Style 
The album is described as alternative rock. De Volkskrants Gert van Veen notes that the diverse styles of the different acts are unified by their use of a "nice and raw", "piercing" guitar sound which was "partly determined by the primitive conditions" of the studio in its early years, a sound which by the compilation's time had become standard with the popularity of grunge and post-grunge.

Reception 
Cashboxs Steve Baltin called the album an "impressive compilation" with an "attention-grabbing" opening track from Cold Water Flat and further strong showings from the Walkabouts, Buffalo Tom, and Treat Her Right. Billboard called it a "welcome salute to one of the nation's most dynamic recording facilities". The Heights Brian J. DiMattia called the album "Boston indie rock at its best" which would have warranted a four-star rating if not for the record coming in poor packaging docking it half a star.

AllMusic's Jonathan Lewis also noted Treat Her Right as a highlight, as well as Radiohead and Billy Bragg, while calling the work of other acts "standard". Lewis concluded that while the album features several "heavyweights" of early 1990s alt rock, it's the "lesser-known artists who manage to shine through." The Washington Posts Mark Jenkins said few of the songs were catchy, with "Everyone Can Play Guitar" and "Off to One Side" being notable exceptions, but that those two songs are both available on their respective bands' albums so they wouldn't compel fans to purchase the compilation.

Track listing

External links 
 Discogs entry for this album

References 

1995 compilation albums
Alternative rock compilation albums